Bankfoot Athletic Football Club were a Scottish junior football club based in Bankfoot, near Perth.

The SJFA restructured prior to the 2006–07 season, and Athletic found themselves in the twelve-team East Region, Central Division. They finished twelfth (bottom) in their first season in the division.

The club spent the 2013–14 season in abeyance owing to a lack of committee members  and at the Scottish Junior Football Association's AGM on 21 June 2014 it was announced that Bankfoot had withdrawn as members of the SJFA.

Notable former players
Paul Sturrock
Jim Weir

References

 
Football clubs in Scotland
Scottish Junior Football Association clubs
Football clubs in Perth and Kinross
Association football clubs established in 1919
1919 establishments in Scotland
Association football clubs disestablished in 2014
2014 disestablishments in Scotland